The Sancta Sanctorum is a Roman Catholic chapel entered via the Scala Sancta (Holy Staircase) of the Lateran Palace in Rome. It was the original private chapel of the papacy before it moved to Avignon, and later to the Vatican Palace. The chapel is the only building from the old Lateran Palace that was not destroyed during its reconstruction.

Name 
The chapel acquired the Sancta Sanctorum sometime in the ninth century. The spelling is Sancta, the neuter plural form of the Latin adjective "holy": this is a reference to the multiple relics preserved there (i.e. "the most holy things") and to the Holy of Holies in Jerusalem, traditionally called in Latin both sanctum sanctorum (the singular form) or sancta sanctorum.

History
The founder of the chapel is unknown. It was originally dedicated to Saint Lawrence, and served as the pope's private oratory until the Renaissance. It is located at the top of the Scala Sancta, ("Holy Stairs"). The first mention of the chapel is found in the Liber Pontificalis, during the tenure of Pope Stephen III (†772). The antiquarian Marangoni along with Onofrio Panvino quote documents that cite the acquisition in 583 by Pope Gregory of relics from Constantinople, including an arm of St Lawrence, that were housed in the church of St Lawrence in Lateran palace. 

It formed part of the Lateran Palace, headquarters of the public offices of the papal court throughout the Middle Ages. Gregory IV (†844) had a private apartment built near the chapel to allow him to pray there. Later Pope Alexander III is mentioned as presiding here over the ceremony of the washing of the feet.  It later became part of the Palace and Holy Steps complex commissioned by Sixtus V in 1586.

Artwork 

The chapel is relatively small and rectangular, with a nave seven meters long and an apse nearly 6 meters wide.  rectangular apse measuring 2.73 by 5.85 metres.

The main altar contains a cypress wood reliquary box, placed under the altar by Pope Leo III (†816). It supposedly houses the bones of at least 13 saints (whereof the chapel derives the name "holy of holies"). The reliquary box itself is taken to represent the Ark of the Covenant in Solomon's Temple.

Over the course of time, other relics were added, including the cloisonné enameled cross commissioned by Paschal I (†824).

The opus sectile floor dates from 1278. This style of intarsiated pavement was created in the 12th century by the Cosmati family of stonecutters and widely copied throughout Rome in the 13th century. 

The chapel also houses the Uronica or Acheiropoieta Lateranese icon of Christ Pantocrator, known as the Veronica, that was supposedly begun by Saint Luke and finished as an acheiropoieta (which translates to "images not made by human hands") since finished by an angel. Other acheiropoieta include the image of Christ’s face that miraculously imprinted itself on the sudarium of Veronica.

References 

Latin words and phrases
Roman Catholic churches in Rome
Sancta Sanctorum